TidalCycles (also known as "Tidal") is a live coding environment designed for musical improvisation and composition. In particular, it is a domain-specific language embedded in Haskell, focused on the generation and manipulation of audible or visual patterns. It was originally designed for heavily percussive, polyrhythmic grid-based music, but now uses a flexible, functional reactive representation for patterns, using rational time. Tidal may therefore be applied to a wide range of musical styles, although its cyclic approach to time means that it affords use in repetitive styles such as Algorave.

Background 
TidalCycles was created by Alex McLean who also coined the term Algorave.

TidalCycles is a domain-specific language embedded in Haskell, focused on the generation and manipulation of audible or visual patterns. Tidal's representation of rhythm is based on metrical cycles, inspired by Indian classical music, supporting polyrhythmic and polymetric structures using a flexible, functional reactive representation for patterns, and rational time. Tidal does not produce sound itself, but via the SuperCollider sound environment through the SuperDirt framework, or via MIDI or Open Sound Control.

Tidal is also used widely in academic research, including as a representation in music AI, as a language in network music, and in electronic literature.

Tidal is widely used at Algorave algorithmic dance music events, as well as being used on high profile music releases. It has been featured on BBC Radio 3's New Music Show.

Artists using TidalCycles 

 Richard Devine
 Beatrice Dillon
 Lil Data
 Lizzie Wilson (aka Digital Selves)
MIRI KAT
Daniel M Karlsson
65daysofstatic
Benjamin Wynn

References

External links
 Tidalcycles repositories

Digital art
Computer programming
Live coding
Algorave
Functional programming
Music technology
2009 establishments